Carlo Carlei (born 16 April 1960 in Nicastro) is an Italian film director. He has directed movies such as Fluke and Romeo & Juliet.

External links
 

Living people
People from the Province of Catanzaro
Italian film directors
1960 births
20th-century Italian people
21st-century Italian people